Antônio Augusto de Moraes Liberato (April 10, 1959 – November 21, 2019), better known as Gugu Liberato or simply Gugu, was a Brazilian television presenter, entrepreneur, actor and singer.

Early life
Liberato was born in São Paulo, Brazil, the son of Portuguese immigrants. He used to write letters to Silvio Santos (who later hired him) suggesting ideas for programs. He started on television at age 14 as program production assistant on Domingo no Parque (Sunday at the Park), presented by Silvio Santos on SBT. He is regarded as one of the most famous entertainers in the history of Brazilian television, standing next to names like Fausto Silva, Silvio Santos, Hebe Camargo and Xuxa Meneghel.

Career
Liberato began studying dentistry at University of Marilia (Unimar) in Marilia, São Paulo, but dropped out when called by Silvio Santos, who invited him to take up a post in front of the cameras. One of his first programs in 1981 was the Sessão Premiada São Paulo – Rio's version was by Paul Barboza. In 1982, Santos asked Argentine director Nelly Raymond to create a program for Saturday night. Viva a Noite was created, which was initially divided into several parts, and also presented by Ademar Dutra, Mariette Detotto and Jair Ogun. Following some format changes, Gugu remained alone in the program, then directed by Homer Salles. While anchoring Viva a Noite, Gugu also directed Domingo no Parque for sometime and acted as the editor for the President's Week (Semana do Presidente) newsletter, which was aired in the commercial breaks between the Program Silvio Santos show.

After the success of the musical group Menudo, which was extensively promoted by Viva a Noite in 1984, Gugu launched Brazilian musical groups of the same style, such as Dominó and Polegar, becoming a successful businessman.

In August 1987, at the height of the success of Viva a noite, Gugu signed a contract with TV station Rede Globo. But on Saturday Carnival 1988, Santos went to meet the owner of the Rede Globo Roberto Marinho personally, in order to release the presenter so he could stay on SBT. Santos was about to undergo a delicate surgery and made a millionaire proposal to Gugu, offering him much of the Sunday's programming schedule. As a comparison, Liberato's wages increased tenfold, besides earnings coming from advertising.

Liberato debuted in SBT Sundays on April 17, 1988, hosting alone programs like Passa ou Repassa and Cidade Contra Cidade. Gugu also co-hosted Roletrando with Santos.

The TV station Rede Globo, however, had already created a program for Gugu, and the program was ready but without a host. Rede Globo hired hastily Fausto Silva, who ran the Saturday late night show Perdidos na Noite (Lost in the Night) at TV Bandeirantes. So the show Domingão do Faustão started, by chance, on Sunday afternoons at Rede Globo, filling a schedule previously occupied by American TV series.

Even though Gugu was responsible for part of the Sunday programming, he remained anchoring shows on Saturday night, especially musical programs like Sabadão Sertanejo. The greatest success, however, came with the show Domingo Legal, which competed with Domingão do Faustão, ironically a program created to be his. The competition in the late 1990s was for a long period favorable to Gugu, which ended the decade with peaks above 40 rating points.

Personal life and death
Liberato had a domestic partnership with physician Rose Miriam di Matteo, with whom he had three children.

On November 20, 2019, Liberato suffered an accident at his home in Windermere, Greater Orlando, while trying to change the filter on his home's air conditioner; he fell from the roof of his home and hit his head. He was admitted to Orlando Health and it was reported that his condition was critical. Rumors of his death were initially denied, but on November 22, it was confirmed that Liberato had died.

Filmography

TV

Movie theater

Discography  
 1983 - Gugu 
 1984 - Gugu 
 1985 - Gugu Liberato 
 1986 - Gugu Liberato
 1989 - Gugu 
 1989 - Viva a Noite
 1990 - Viva a Noite
 1991 - Gugu Liberato Apresenta: Bailão Sertanejo
 1992 - Gugu Liberato Apresenta: Bailão Sertanejo 2
 1994 - Gugu
 1996 - Parque do Gugu
 1998 - Gugu Cantando Com Você
 2002 - Gugu Para Crianças

References

External links
 

1959 births
2019 deaths
21st-century Brazilian people
Accidental deaths from falls
Accidental deaths in Florida
Brazilian male television actors
Brazilian people of Portuguese descent
Brazilian television presenters
People from São Paulo